Antonina Armato is an American songwriter, record producer, music producer and businesswoman. She is the co-founder and member of Rock Mafia, a record production/songwriting team. Antonina is credited for writing and producing for artists beginning in the 1980s. She has worked with Justin Bieber, Zedd, Gwen Stefani, Demi Lovato, Christina Aguilera, Vanessa Hudgens, Miley Cyrus, Selena Gomez, No Doubt, Wyclef Jean, Green Day, Sheena Easton, Mariah Carey, Ariana Grande, Flo Rida, Ellie Goulding, Tokio Hotel, Descendants 3, AGNEZ MO, and BTS.

Career

1980s–1990s
One of Armato's first major hits was "I Still Believe," which reached number 13 on the Billboard Hot 100 for Brenda K. Starr after being featured on her self-titled album. The track was later covered by Mariah Carey.  Armato was inspired to write the song after a breakup with her boyfriend at the time.

She co-wrote the 1990 Billboard Hot 100 number one single, "She Ain't Worth It", by Glenn Medeiros and Bobby Brown, and also wrote or co-wrote the majority of the other tracks on Medeiros' self titled album, released that year. Armato also co- wrote the 1991 top 20 single "What Comes Naturally" for singer Sheena Easton along with other songs for Easton's 1995 album My Cherie and 1997 album Freedom.

2000s–2010s
Armato has also written songs with the Jonas Brothers. She wrote the Top 40 radio hit "Come Back To Me" for singer Vanessa Hudgens. She also wrote and produced the top 5 single, "Love You like a Love Song" for Selena Gomez. She co-wrote and produced Miley Cyrus's Top 10 singles "See You Again" and "7 Things" and her single "Fly on the Wall". She co-wrote the song "Potential Breakup Song" with pop duo Aly & AJ, which Time and CNN named one of the Top Songs of 2007.

She co-wrote "Bet On It" from High School Musical 2, and "Right Here" from the album Meet Miley Cyrus.

Armato has worked with Adam Lambert and the Beach Girl5 (known as BG5). Rock Mafia wrote and produced Miley Cyrus first single, "Can't Be Tamed" which went top 10 on Billboard and No. 1 on iTunes. She wrote and produced six additional tracks on Cyrus's album Breakout. She produced Bonnie McKee's debut album Trouble along with Rob Cavallo.

Armato co-wrote and produced the platinum song "Naturally" from Kiss & Tell, Selena Gomez & the Scene's debut album., between 2011 and 2012 Rock Mafia wrote and produced different songs for the soundtrack of the television series Shake It Up, among which are "Not Too Young", "Twist My Hips" and "The Star I R". In 2015, Armato co-wrote and produced several songs on Gomez's second solo album Revival. That same year Armato co-wrote and produced "Beautiful Now" and "True Colors" by Zedd.

References

External links 
 

Living people
American record producers
Place of birth missing (living people)
American women songwriters
Year of birth missing (living people)
American women record producers
21st-century American women